The Lindsays of Evelix or Evelick were a family of Scottish baronets from Evelix in Perthshire, a sub-family of the Clan Lindsay.  Heads of the family include:

John Lindsay of Evelix, the founder of the family, third in descent from William Lindsay of Lekoquhay (David Lindsay, 3rd Earl of Crawford's third son), succeeded by his second of five sons, 
Alexander Lindsay of Evelick (bishop), bishop of Dunkeld, succeeded by his eldest son,
Sir Alexander Lindsay of Evelick (1597-1663), 1st Baronet, succeeded by his eldest son,
Sir Alexander Lindsay of Evelick (died 1695), succeeded by his eldest son,
Sir Alexander Lindsay of Evelick (born 1660), succeeded by his eldest son, 
Sir Alexander Lindsay, 3rd Baronet (1683–1762), succeeded by his eldest son, 
Sir David Lindsay of Evelick, died 1797, succeeded by his third son,
Sir Charles Lindsay of Evelick, died by drowning at Demerary on 6 March 1799, with neither wife nor issue.

External links
 http://www.perthshireheritage.co.uk/evelick.html

Lindsay family of Evelix